Agostino Facheris (16th-century) was an Italian painter, active in Bergamo, Italy. He was also known as il Caversegno after the contrada of Presezzo where he was born.

Biography
He was a pupil of Lorenzo Lotto and Andrea Previtali. He collaborated with the latter in completing the polyptych for the church of Santo Spirito in Bergamo. Other works include a Madonna and child with Saints (1536) for the parish church of Locatello and a polyptych (1537) for the parish church of Piazzatorre. He painted a Madonna and Saints for the church of San Bartolomeo of Bergamo; a St Sebastian and St Fabiano for the parish church of Sant'Alessandro della Croce. The panels of the Life of St Giuliano is held by the Galleria Nazionale d'Arte Antica in Rome.

References

Year of birth unknown
Year of death unknown
16th-century Italian painters
Italian male painters
Painters from Bergamo